Dragon-Quest Adventure is a 1980 video game published by The Software Exchange for the TRS-80, programmed by Charles Forsythe.

Contents
Dragon-Quest Adventure is a game in which the dragon Smaegor has kidnapped the king's daughter and plans eats the princess at nightfall.

Reception
Dave Albert reviewed DragonQuest in The Space Gamer No. 44. Albert commented that "Pick up a copy and try to rescue the princess. She needs your help."

References

1980 video games
TRS-80 games
TRS-80-only games
Video games developed in the United States